The Microsoft Puzzlehunt is a quasi-annual Microsoft tradition started in 1999. It is a puzzlehunt in the same vein as the MIT Mystery Hunt and has some similarity to The Game. The hunt is a team puzzle competition which challenges each team to solve a large number of original puzzles of all different kinds. The answers, when used in conjunction with the metapuzzle, lead to a hidden treasure concealed somewhere on the Microsoft campus. Teams spend the weekend solving original and unique puzzles, usually created by the team that won the last hunt. Puzzles may be anything from traditional puzzles like crosswords, word searches, cryptograms, jigsaw puzzles, word play and logic problems to wandering around campus to find landmarks or puzzles that have to be solved on location. Microsoft Puzzlehunt was founded by Bruce Leban, along with Roy Leban and Gordon Dow.

The Microsoft Puzzlehunt takes place over a weekend at the Microsoft campus in Redmond, Washington, usually lasting approximately 31 hours from beginning to end.  In general, teams are no larger than 12, at least 4 must be current Microsoft employees, and at least 6 must be current or former employees.

Microsoft has a rich tradition of puzzle events, including Microsoft Puzzle Safari, College Puzzle Challenge, Microsoft Intern Puzzleday and Microsoft Iron Puzzler, but Microsoft Puzzlehunt remains the "main event" for puzzle solvers in the Microsoft community.

Puzzlehunt I: The Microsoft Games (August 13-15, 1999)
Theme: Olympics
Participants: 35 teams, 275 players
Hosted by: TLA (Bruce Leban, Dan Westreich, Gordon Dow, Jason Woolever, Matthew Kotler, Roy Leban, Sam Sherry, Sarita James, Scott Ruthfield, and Shannon Talbott)
Won by: Killer Bees
Awards: Gold, silver and bronze medals
Memorable Events/Puzzles: This first hunt was a three-day hunt, running Friday afternoon to Sunday night. The event was three rounds (Bronze, Silver, Gold). Killer Bees won the Gold round, the Silver Round, and the hunt. United Farm Workers won the Bronze round.

Puzzlehunt II: Age of Puzzles (April 1-2, 2000)
Theme: Age of Empires - The puzzles from this hunt can be found here: .
Participants: 27 teams, 305 players (1 team finished)
Hosted by: Killer Bees (Eric LeVine, Kenny Young, Dana Young, Steve Bush, Christine Chang, Jeff Reynar, and Todd Roshak)
Won by: Cracking Good Toast
Awards: T-shirts
Landmarks: First hunt with computer scoring and a point system.

Puzzlehunt III: You Don't Know Puzzles (November 4-5, 2000)
Theme: Game shows
Participants: 28 teams, 344 players (1 team finished)
Hosted by: Cracking Good Toast (Jack Bridges, Jennifer Gosnell, Mark Lambert, Alex Mogilevsky, Tom Powers, Briand Sanderson, Peter Sarrett, Ken Wong, and Mark Engelberg)
Won by: Killer Bees
Awards: Computer games
Memorable Events: Three live, massively multiplayer game show events, each of which concealed a puzzle which the winning team didn't need to solve.
Landmarks: First hunt with a team limit of 12 at a time (substitutions allowed). First hunt with live events. First repeat winner.

Puzzlehunt IV: Clue (November 3-4, 2001)
Theme: Clue board game and film
Participants: 38 teams, 416 players (4 teams finished)
Hosted by: The Usual Suspects (Jennifer Cockrill, Giovanni Della-Libera, Meredith McClurg, Brooke Nelson, Andrew Ryder, Peter Sagerson, and Kenny Wolf)
Won by: SCRuBBers
Awards: T-shirts, and each of the 4 finishing teams got their choice of one of the weapons
Landmarks: First hunt with no substitutions (hard limit of 12 team members). First hunt which had multiple teams finish.

Puzzlehunt V: Mission: Impuzzible (September 21-22, 2002)
Theme: Mission: Impossible
Participants: 45 teams, 469 players (2 teams finished)
Hosted by: SCRuBBers (Troy Barnes, Josh Benaloh, Steve Dupree, Matt Lyons, Becca Olsen, Deborah Pierce, Jon Pincus, Dan Simon, Terence Spies, Dave Thaler, Jay Thaler, and Jeff Wallace)
Won by: Cracking Good Toast
Awards: Mission: Impuzzible portfolios
Landmarks: First and second place teams were separated by 11 minutes.

Puzzlehunt VI: TimeCorps (May 17-18, 2003)
Theme: Time travel
Participants: 40 teams, 439 players (4 teams finished)
Hosted by: Cracking Good Toast (Andrew Becker, Rolf Buchner, Thomas Coon, Greg Hermann, Victor Kozyrev, Mike Marcelais, Don Munsil, Peter Sarrett, and Roger Wolff)
Won by: TLA Lovers Anonymous
Awards: Hourglasses
Memorable Events/Puzzles: Puzzles were given in three waves, with the puzzles in wave three having the same names as those in the first two waves, but a slightly different puzzle in keeping with the idea that the villain went back and changed time. Chicago Fire, a crossword puzzle on red construction paper, was a memorable puzzle in that it required pouring water on the puzzle to reveal the Scotch-Guarded squares.
Landmarks: Largest win margin in hunt history (8 hours).

Puzzlehunt 7: Alice in Puzzlehunt (March 20-21, 2004)
Theme: Alice in Wonderland
Participants: 51 teams, 558 players (1 team finished)
Hosted by: TLA Loves Alice (Brett Roark, Bruce Kaskel, Bruce Leban, Chip Brown, Darren Rigby, Elan Lee, Gordon Dow, Ken Jordan, Kiran Kedlaya, Mike Koss, Paul Grimes, Roy Leban, and Scott Ruthfield)
Won by: Staggering Geniuses
Awards: Framed mirror with image of a playing card showing Alice as both Queen of Hearts and a chess queen. Solvers of the three first stage metapuzzles also received plastic Cheshire Cat coins, White Knight business cards and copies of Washington State House Resolution No. 4717.
Memorable Events/Puzzles: The actual Sunday New York Times crossword puzzle was part of the event. Roy Leban, the puzzle creator and a New York Times crossword contributor, coordinated with Will Shortz, the puzzle editor for the New York Times, to have his puzzle published on that particular Sunday. Other memorable events included the Puzzle Special pizza that had to be ordered from the local Pizza Hut and Washington State House Resolution No. 4717 PDF officially recognizing March 20-21st, 2004 as Alice in Puzzlehunt Weekend in the State of Washington.
Landmarks: First, second, and third place teams were searching in the same building (but not on the same floor) as time was about to expire.

Puzzlehunt 8: The Hard Way (February 19-20, 2005)
Theme: Las Vegas, complete with showgirls and a time-share presentation
Participants: 57 teams, 643 players (6 teams finished)
Hosted by: Staggering Geniuses (Amanda O'Connor, Mark L. Gottlieb, Sean Trowbridge, Mike Selinker, Matt Ruhlen, Greg Lewis, Jason Alcock, Matt Dixon, Ron Giesen, Matt Jones, Chris McBride, and Chris Pearo)
Won by: Cracking Good Toast
Awards: Giant dice 
Memorable Events/Puzzles: Teams were given a "Las Vegas" (transformed Microsoft Campus) travel brochure at the opening ceremony with seven puzzles and a metapuzzle embedded within. Each of the seven puzzles gave an instruction for cutting out and taping together buildings, cutting holes in the buildings, positioning them on the map, and shining a light through the buildings from a particular position over the map to cast the shadow of a phone number, which kicked off your meeting with the nefarious Mr. Big.
Portions of this hunt appear in the November 2005 issue of GAMES World of Puzzles.
Landmarks: Second largest win margin in hunt history (? hours). First three-time winner.  First hunt to have a team (not the winning team) solve all puzzles.

Puzzlehunt 9: Doomsday (November 5-6, 2005)
Theme: American Comic Books.  Before the hunt started, the title was "Countdown".
Participants: 62 teams, 708 players (6 teams finished)
Hosted by: Everyday Heroes (Karen Babcock, Stephen Beeman, Nick Gedge, Dave Heberer, Jesse McGatha, Brett Roark, and Richard Rowan)
Won by: Cracking Good Toast
Awards: Keys to the city and Captain Micropolis/Puzzler coins
Memorable Events/Puzzles: Captain Micropolis, the superhero defender of Micropolis, announced his retirement, then flew off for one last challenge, where he unfortunately met his doom at the hands of evil super-villain The Puzzler. The opening round was a newspaper distributed immediately after the opening event, ending with the first meta. There were 8 meta puzzles, with the final one being six rebus puzzles (gotten from the intermediate six metas), which each fed into a final rebus meta puzzle. At the end of the hunt, it was learned that Captain Micropolis was really The Puzzler and the winning teams saved him from a fate worse than death.
Landmarks: First hunt to use an unlocking scheme (solving a puzzle gained you another puzzle), with no bonuses for first solves. First four-time winner.

Puzzlehunt A:  Atlantis (February 10-11, 2007)
Theme: Atlantis
Participants: 75 teams, 864 players (12 teams finished)
Hosted by: Buzz Lime Pi and Friends (Chris Battey, Mike Burk, Jeremy Elson, Carrie Emmerich, Nick Emmerich, Jon Howell, Jay Lorch, Evan McLain, Sora Werner, Chase Stephens, Robert Stewart, Michelle Teague, Dana Young, Kenny Young)
Won by: Death of Dr. Zero
Awards: Atlantis "Access Tokens" (laser-etched acrylic disc)
Memorable Events/Puzzles: A puzzle that used an interactive Virtual Earth map to locate items hidden on campus (two members of the organizing team had to fly an airplane over the Microsoft campus with a high-resolution digital camera to get the level of detail down to 3cm per pixel, allowing each puzzle answer to indicate a 6-foot square region where an item was hidden). A puzzle that had you build a quinoa-powered analog computer that produced a phone number.
Landmarks: The top three teams finished the hunt separated by only 16 minutes. First hunt with automated web answer submission system. First hunt to have a dramatic end-of-hunt spectacle at the closing ceremonies (in previous hunts, end-of-hunt storyline was only seen by finishing teams).

Puzzlehunt 11.0: Caught in the Net (October 6-7, 2007)
Theme: Tron
Participants: 71 teams, 830 players (14 teams finished)
Hosted by: SCRuBBers (Troy Barnes, Josh Benaloh, Nat Dupree, Steve Dupree, Jessica Lambert, Matt Lyons, Dan Simon, Dave Thaler, Jay Thaler, Kaylene Thaler, Ian Tullis, Jeff Wallace, Roger Wolfson)
Won by: The Usual Suspects
Awards: Discs of Tron (illuminated flying discs)
Memorable Events/Puzzles: Illuminated flying disks and puzzle spheres on the playfields in the dark. Balancing puzzles solves between conflicting goals -- keeping the MCP happy by solving his puzzles, while still working on solutions that would help the internet rebel forces and contribute to the Meta puzzle.
Landmarks: Introduced an unlocking system that also tracked top 3 fastest solves per puzzle, based on unlock times. A web interface built in Microsoft Silverlight which provided an immersive experience appropriate for the Tron theme. First and only hunt in which all finishing teams wrote a program to solve the Meta.

Puzzlehunt 123: Jeopardy!/Puzzlehaunt! (February 28-March 1, 2009) 
Theme: Jeopardy! morphing into a haunted puzzlehunt
Participants: 84 teams, 975 players in Redmond (1 team finished); 16 teams, 178 players in Bay Area (1 team finished)
Hosted by: The Usual Suspects (Rich Bragg, Giovanni Della-Libera, Gordon Dow, Caroll Ferry, Douglas Ferry, Dave Fisher, Brent Lang, David Miller, Brooke Nelson, Andrew Ryder, and Peter Sagerson), Cracking Good Toast (Andrew Becker, Mike Marcelais, and Peter Sarrett), Dana Young, and Kenny Young
Won by: SCRuBBers (Redmond); Demonic Robot Tyrannosaurs (the Burninators and coedastronomy, Bay Area)
Awards: Jeopardy! plaques
Memorable Events/Puzzles: Three-dimensional metapuzzles constructed of 30 paper rectangles forming a rhombic triacontahedron, 20 truncated triangles (nonagons) forming an icosahedron, and 12 pentagons forming a dodecahedron, respectively, with a final meta using all of the pieces combined to form a rhombicosidodecahedron, on the surface of which participants had to solve a chess puzzle.  "Daily Double" puzzles that encouraged the entire team to work together to solve a timed, interactive puzzle for additional points.
Landmarks: First hunt to be simulcast to the Bay Area. First and only hunt to have separate competitive and recreational divisions. New record for largest hunt with 100 teams and over 1100 players.
Note: The combination of themes (and the out-of-sequence number) was a result of the teams planning hunts 12 and 13 merging.

Puzzlehunt 14: Travel the Number 14 (September 10-11, 2011) 
Theme: Trains
Participants: TBA
Hosted by: Liboncatipu (Ben Andrews, Jen Chalfan, Jamie Eckman, Jeff Ford, Jonobie Ford, Drew Hoskins, Mike Janney, Jason Lucas, Chris Moore, Andy Rich, Rehana Rodrigues, Deanna Rubin, Adam Ruprecht)
Won by: Death of Dr. Zero (Redmond); Friday the 13th Part VI (Bay Area)
Awards: Individually personalized wooden train whistles
Memorable Events/Puzzles: Four "whistle stops", each designed to be projected in a conference room and solved by the entire team
Landmarks:  First hunt with explicit rules governing how teams were provided with hints and data confirmation.

Puzzlehunt 15: The Motion Picture Post-Apocalyptic (June 21-22, 2014) 
Theme: Movies
Memorable Events/Puzzles: Despite the hunt being modular, with each author choosing their own theme, the final meta combined all of the module themes into a single runaround puzzle.
Landmarks: First hunt constructed in a modular fashion, with multiple individuals and teams contributing small modules rather than one team constructing the entire hunt.
Won By: Will It Blend?

Puzzlehunt 16: Library Island (April 18-19, 2015) 
Theme: Books/Library
Participants: 80 Teams, 832 Players (53 teams finished)
Hosted by: Organizers: Giovanni Della-Libera, Andrew Paulsel; Authors: Jonathan Birch, Amos Eshel, Nathan Figueroa, Rorke Haining, Andrew Hoskins, Roy Leban, Philip Loh, Jay Lorch, Jesse McGatha, Richard Thames Rowan, Guy Srinivasan, Dana Young, Kenny Young; Assistants: Geoffrey Antos, Andrew Ryder 
Memorable Events/Puzzles: The opening module was a physical book, The Librarian's Almanaq by Roy Leban, delivered by a courier to the opening session and later sold on Amazon.
Landmarks: First hunt to use a final puzzle with a timed unlock system to allow more than 66% of teams to finish the final puzzle. 
Won By: Will It Blend?

Puzzlehunt 17: KPUZ Music Festival (May 21-22, 2016) 
Theme: Popular Music
Participants: 79 Teams, 793 Players (27 teams finished Diamond metameta, 44 teams finished Platinum metameta, 50 teams finished Gold metameta)
Hosted by: Full module authors and mentors: Amos Eshel, Bruce Leban, Dana Young, Guy Srinivasan, Kenny Young, Megan Quinn, Michael Beyer, Morgan Brown, Robin Schriebman, Roy Leban, Sean McCarthy; Mentors: Glenn Willen, Jay Lorch, Jesse McGatha; Individual puzzle authors: Adam Skalenakis, Greg Filpus, Jen Traeger, Ken Pacquer, Philip Z Loh.
Memorable Events/Puzzles: One module included numerous short covers of "smashed-up" songs, with music from one song and modified lyrics derived from a different song. Lack of coordination between module authors caused there to be more cutout puzzles in this hunt than ever before.
Landmarks: First hunt run completely by authors who were also competitors in the event. First hunt to provide "fast forwards" which allowed teams to get hints on the metameta puzzles in exchange for points (teams that took fast forwards were ranked below teams that did not take a fast forward).
Won by: Will It Blend?

Puzzlehunt 18: The Puzzling Zone (September 16/17, 2017) 
Theme: Twilight Zone
Participants: 75 Teams (22 finished)
Hosted by: SCRuBBers
Memorable Events/Puzzles: Four teams finished before Midnight on Saturday, and two more teams were ready to complete the final in-person final puzzle before Midnight.
Landmarks: First hunt where top 10 teams (instead of top 3 teams) received a trophy, a custom pin. 
Won by: Will It Blend?

Puzzlehunt 19: Channel 19 (May 5-6, 2018) 
Theme: Television
Hosted by: Module hunt
Won by: There's Always Puzzles in the Banana Stand

Puzzlehunt 20: (May 4-5, 2019) 
Theme: Theater
Participants: 100 Teams (30 finished)
Hosted by: Full module authors: Aaron Shaver, Amos Eschel, Asia Comeau, Bruce Leban, Dana Young, Derek Young, Elizabeth French, Jason Deakins, Jay Lorch, Jonah Ostroff, Justin Melvin, Kenny Young, Margaret Urfer, Megan Quinn, Morgan Brown, Natalie Parisi, Roy Leban
Won by: The Usual Suspects

Puzzlehunt 21: (May 1-2, 2021) 
Theme: Video Games
Participants: 170 Teams (6 finished)
Hosted by: Full module authors: Adam Young, Bob Ma, Dana Young, Dave Miller, Derek Young, Jason Deakins, Jonah Ostroff, Josie Effinger, Kenny Young, Matt Du, Megan Quinn, Morgan Brown, Peter Sarrett, Philip Z Loh, Robb Effinger, Sean McCarthy
Memorable Events/Puzzles: This hunt contained two unique methods of acquiring hint coins, implemented to account for the pandemic-imposed virtual nature of the event.  One method involved navigating a Minecraft version of the Microsoft campus and accomplishing various in-game tasks.  The other, called Achievements, asked players to complete activities in the real world and submit photographic or video proof of their accomplishments.
Won by: Imposters So Meta Even This Anagram

Puzzlehunt 22: Puzzlehunt Parallax (September 17-18, 2022) 
Theme: Alternate Earths
Participants: 169 Teams (10 finished)
Hosted by: Thread authors: Aaron Shaver, Adam Leban, Bruce Leban, Emily Dietrich, Greg Cooper, Greg Filpus, Guy Srinivasan, Jesse McGatha, Jonathan Berkowitz, Justin Melvin, Keith Jackson, Michael Beyer, Richard Thames Rowan, Roy Leban, Tanis O'Connor, Thomas Snyder
Landmarks: First hunt hosted in the threaded format; hosting team was split into three planning groups, allowing for larger, more interconnected rounds.
Won by: Will It Blend?

External resources
A list of Microsoft puzzlehunts
Puzzlehunt II
Microsoft culture
Puzzle hunts
Recurring events established in 1999
Redmond, Washington